William Andrew van Wyk (born ) is a South African rugby union player that played first class rugby for the  in 2016. He made six appearances in the 2016 Currie Cup qualification series, and a single appearance in the 2016 Currie Cup Premier Division. He also represented South Africa Schools in 2009. His regular position is fly-half.

References

South African rugby union players
Living people
1991 births
People from Ceres, Western Cape
Rugby union fly-halves
Boland Cavaliers players
Rugby union players from the Western Cape